Alexi Jo McCammond (born 1993/1994) is a political journalist.  She served as an NBC and MSNBC contributor, a contributor for PBS's Washington Week, and is currently a reporter for the political website Axios. McCammond appeared on 2020's Forbes 30 Under 30 list.

Education
McCammond attended Guilford High School in Rockford, Illinois. In 2011, she attended the University of Chicago on a full 4-year QuestBridge scholarship, graduating in 2015, with an A.B. in sociology and Spanish language and literature. She received additional training from the National Association of Black Journalists. While at the University of Chicago, McCammond also wrote for student political newspaper The Gate. At the university she was a member of Kappa Alpha Theta fraternity. She is of mixed ethnic descent.<ref>{{Cite news|first= Alexi|last= McCammond|authorlink=   |title= I Think Of My Dad Whenever Police Kill A Black Man  |newspaper=Bustle|date=September 20, 2016 |url= https://www.bustle.com/articles/184976-my-dad-is-an-unarmed-black-man-will-he-be-shot-next |quote=My dad is a 6' 3 man who is actually half white, but that doesn't matter, because to a police officer, he is black.}}</ref>

Career
McCammond started her career as a freelance political writer for the women's magazine Cosmopolitan and later left to become a news editor at women's online news magazine Bustle. She joined the website Axios in 2017. McCammond wrote about Michael Bloomberg's withdrawal from the 2020 Democratic primary race in March 2020 as well as leaked presidential schedules revealing that 60% of Donald Trump's days were devoted to "executive time" while he was president.

In November 2019, former NBA star and TNT commentator Charles Barkley was accused of threatening McCammond in an Atlanta bar prior to the 2020 Democratic primary debate in Atlanta, Georgia. After McCammond commented that one of Barkley's remarks seemed contradictory, he reportedly said, "I don’t hit women, but if I did I would hit you." Barkley later issued a public apology.

McCammond received further media attention related to her relationship with TJ Ducklo, a member of the Biden 2020 campaign, while she covered the campaign. Ducklo, White House Deputy Press Secretary under President Biden, was fired for harassing female Politico reporter Tara Palmeri. Ducklo reportedly made "derogatory and misogynistic comments" toward Palmeri during a phone call and accused her of being "jealous" of his relationship with McCammond. The couple publicly announced their relationship in February 8, 2021. On February 12, Ducklo was suspended without pay and apologized. Under pressure from the Vanity Fair article that reported it, he resigned from his White House position the next day.

In March 2021, McCammond was selected as Editor in Chief of Conde Nast's Teen Vogue. Subsequent to the appointment, racist, bigoted and homophobic tweets written by McCammond a decade earlier resurfaced. She apologized to the staff of Teen Vogue. Several media makers of Asian descent called for McCammond's removal, citing the American fashion business's rampant racism against Asians and the rise in anti-Asian violence during the COVID-19 pandemic. Former Teen Vogue'' editor Elaine Welteroth called her tweets and the feelings behind them "racist and abhorrent and indefensible." More than twenty members of the staff voiced concern internally and to the press. In response, Ulta Beauty paused $1 million in advertising in the online-only publication, and McCammond resigned from the position prior to starting in the role.

McCammond rejoined Axios in July 2021 serving as a political reporter.

Awards
McCammond received the 2019 Emerging Journalist Award from the National Association of Black Journalists and was on 2020's Forbes 30 Under 30 list.

References

Living people
University of Chicago alumni
American women journalists
People from Chicago
People from Rockford, Illinois
1990s births
21st-century American non-fiction writers
21st-century American women writers
21st-century African-American women writers
21st-century African-American writers